Sarhani (also Romanized as Sarḩānī; also known as Sarjānī and Sarkhānī) is a village in Meydavud Rural District, Meydavud District, Bagh-e Malek County, Khuzestan Province, Iran. At the 2006 census, its population was 1,134, in 234 families.

References 

Populated places in Bagh-e Malek County